John Tambouras (born 30 January 1979 in Darwin, Australia) is a retired Australian footballer.

Club career
Tambouras attracted the attention of South Melbourne F.C. who signed him on as a teenager and it was with them that he gained his first experience of playing in a semi professional environment.

He then went abroad and played in his parents' country of Greece for Kalamata. During his time here, he played against Olympiacos in the Intertoto Cup which was drawn 1–1.

Following his time in Greece he was signed by New Zealand's only professional side, the Auckland Kingz for the 2003–2004 Australian NSL season. That season he won the club's "Player of the Year" award.

The following season saw him play in the new A-League with the New Zealand Knights but was let go at the end of the season.

After his first season in the A League he joined Malaysian side Pahang where he helped the club win the FA Cup which was decided on penalties. With the Malaysian season over he briefly returned to the New Zealand Knights.

Post Knights he trialed at Romanian club FC Universitatea Craiova in January 2007, failing to secure a position with the club, but then was offered a contract from Irish club Drogheda United in July the same year.  Whilst at Drogheda he played in the Uefa Cup qualifying rounds and helped the club win the Fai Eircom League of Ireland for the first time in the club's history.

After leaving Drogheda, he moved to Azerbaijan for a week-long trial at Neftchi Baku, this resulted in him signing a three-year contract with the club.

Following a nomadic period playing in Asia and Europe, John was signed in June 2009 by A League's newest club, North Queensland Fury for their debut A League season.

On 2 March 2010 Tambouras went on trial, and then accepted a deal, from Chinese second division outfit Guangzhou Evergrande to play in the upcoming season. He made his China League One debut for Guangzhou against Pudong Zobon on 10 April. Just playing two matches for Guangzhou, Tambouras was released in June.

Coaching
As of October 2010 Tambouras was appointed as the skills acquisition trainer for the Northern Territory, a role set up and partly funded by FFA. He is working predominantly with 9- to 13-year-olds, teaching them the National Curriculum.

Honours
With South Melbourne:
 NSL Championship: 1997–1998, 1998–1999
With Pahang FA:
 Malaysia FA Cup: 2005–2006
With Drogheda United:
 League of Ireland: 2007

References

External links
 Aussie Footballers Tabain to Tathem 
 North Queensland Fury profile

1979 births
Living people
Soccer players from Melbourne
Australian people of Greek descent
Australian expatriate soccer players
Expatriate footballers in Malaysia
A-League Men players
League of Ireland players
Drogheda United F.C. players
Football Kingz F.C. players
Kalamata F.C. players
New Zealand Knights FC players
Northern Fury FC players
South Melbourne FC players
Caroline Springs George Cross FC players
Guangzhou F.C. players
China League One players
Expatriate footballers in China
Expatriate footballers in Azerbaijan
Association football defenders
Australian soccer players